Dani is a village located at the southern tip of Myanmar's Rakhine State.

References 

Populated places in Rakhine State